Pablo Raul Lugo Cruz (born September 28, 1932) is a retired Puerto Rican boxer, who competed for his native country at the 1952 Summer Olympics in Helsinki, Finland.

There he was defeated in the first round of the Men's Flyweight (– 51 kg) division by Austria's Alfred Zima. Cruz  won the gold medal in the same weight division at the 1959 Central American and Caribbean Games in Caracas, Venezuela.

1952 Olympic Results

Below are the results of Pablo Lugo, a Puerto Rican flyweight boxer who competed at the 1952 Olympics in Helsinki:

 Round of 32: lost to Alfred Zima (Austria) by decision, 1-2

References
sports-reference

1932 births
Living people
Flyweight boxers
Boxers at the 1952 Summer Olympics
Olympic boxers of Puerto Rico
Puerto Rican male boxers
Central American and Caribbean Games gold medalists for Puerto Rico
Competitors at the 1959 Central American and Caribbean Games
Central American and Caribbean Games medalists in boxing
20th-century Puerto Rican people